Ladislav Jirků (4 June 1946 – 16 August 2020) was a Czech academic and politician who served as a Deputy.

References

1946 births
2020 deaths
Czech politicians
Civic Democratic Alliance politicians
TOP 09 politicians
Members of the Chamber of Deputies of the Czech Republic (2010–2013)
People from Jihlava
Charles University alumni